Marginella simulata is a species of sea snail, a marine gastropod mollusk in the family Marginellidae, the margin snails.

Distribution
This marine species occurs off Angola.

References

 Gofas S. & Fernandes F. 1994. The Marginellidae of Angola. The genus Marginella. Journal of Conchology 35(2): 103–119
 Cossignani T. (2006). Marginellidae & Cystiscidae of the World. L'Informatore Piceno. 408pp.

imulata
Gastropods described in 1994